Glastonbury is a town in Hartford County, Connecticut, United States, formally founded in 1693 and first settled in 1636. It was named after Glastonbury in Somerset, England. The town center is defined by the U.S. Census Bureau as a census-designated place (CDP). The population was 35,159 at the 2020 census.

History
In 1672, the General Court granted Wethersfield and Hartford permission to extend Pyaug's boundary line  to the east. By 1690, Wethersfield had permitted Pyaug residents to form a separate town and, the town of Glassenbury was created in 1693.

The ties have not been completely broken: the oldest continuously operating ferry in the United States still runs between South Glastonbury and Rocky Hill, also then part of Wethersfield, as it did as far back as 1655. One result of being split off from Wethersfield was that the town was built along a main road, rather than around the large green that anchors most New England towns. After part of New London Turnpike was realigned to eliminate the rotary in the middle of town during the mid-20th century, a small green was established there.

During the American Revolutionary War, several homes were used to hold classes from Yale University. Noah Webster was a student in these classes; later he taught at one of Glastonbury's one-room schoolhouses.

Glastonbury freed its slaves in the 1780s, 60 years before Connecticut formally abolished slavery. The town organized its first library in 1803. It organized the first hospital shortly after the Revolution to combat and treat smallpox. By the end of the Revolution, there were ten schools, formed one by one during the 18th century.

During the American Revolution, George Stocking's gunpowder factory operated in the town. In 1785, the town residents renamed Glassenbury Glastenbury. In the 18th and early 19th centuries, Glastenbury was a shipbuilding town. Located on the Connecticut River, it had reliable waterpower and nearby hardwood forests of oak. Sawmills, charcoal kilns, and foundries developed around the shipyards to process timber and other goods for their needs.

As shipbuilding was ending, the early industrial beginning continued. The J.B. Williams Soap Factory started in 1840 in James B. Williams's drugstore in Manchester, where he experimented with chemical formulas for shaving soap. When he had produced a formula that satisfied him, he moved his business to Glastonbury. Two years later, he was joined by his brother, William Stuart Williams. They formed what is believed to be the world's first commercial soap manufacturing business. Although shaving soap was their first product, they also made ink and shoe blacking. The J.B. Williams Company's products included Williams 'Lectric Shave and Aqua Velva. Over time, J.B. Williams expanded to Montreal (around 1922), England, and Argentina. When the business was sold in 1957, ten former employees organized Glastonbury Toiletries and continued operation into the 1970s. J. B. Williams Park, on Neipsic Road, is named for James B. Williams.

Remaining parts of the industrial complex have been adapted for use as the Soap Factory Condominiums. Another portion was occupied by the Glastonbury Board of Education office and is now occupied by a translation company.

In 1870, the town's name was changed from Glastenbury to Glastonbury, to match Glastonbury, England. During the World Wars, Glastonbury factories supplied leather and woolen goods to the military of Belgium, France, Great Britain, Italy, and the United States. In addition, Glastonbury has been a center for feldspar mills, cotton mills, paper mills, and silver plate factories. It also had an airplane building industry.

J.H. Hale Orchards began operations in 1866 in Glastonbury. John Howard Hale became known as the Peach King for developing a peach that could withstand New England winters and was disease-resistant, as well as for his operations' large, national scale. He also had land in Georgia and was the first Glastonbury industry to establish a branch outside the state. A marketing pioneer, Hale shipped peaches to markets all over the country.

Hale never went beyond grade school, but he initiated the founding of Storrs Agricultural College, now the University of Connecticut. He helped to organize the Glastonbury Grange and the State Grange. His home, at the intersection of Main Street and Route 17, has been adapted in the 20th century for use first as a restaurant and, more recently, for business offices.

Henry Saglio began a pioneering effort to breed a white chicken, because black pinfeathers were difficult to pluck from a bird headed for the dinner table. In 1948, the Saglio Brothers formed Arbor Acres and produced a broiler chicken that A&P Food Stores awarded the title "Chicken of Tomorrow". By 1958, Arbor Acres was selling globally. Today the brand is owned by Aviagen. In 1977, Henry Saglio was inducted into the Poultry Hall of Fame.

Glastonbury was also a major grower of broad-leaf tobacco. This agricultural tradition is carried on by the orchards and berry farms on its hills.

In 1993, Billy Joel filmed part of the video for his song "The River of Dreams" in a barn in South Glastonbury. The video also has a scene with the Rocky Hill-Glastonbury Ferry.

Geography

The town begins on the banks of the Connecticut River and extends up into foothills, many of which provide a view of Hartford's skyline. Some major developments in the town are built entirely on relatively steep hills, such as Minnechaug Mountain, the major residential area developed from the 1970s until late 1990s.

Part of Glastonbury resides in an area called Kongscut Mountain, locally called Rattlesnake Mountain, because it has a small population of timber rattlesnakes. Since that area is sparsely developed and mostly in a state forest, the snakes pose little threat.

The town has a small private lake, Diamond Lake, surrounded by growing subdivisions of large homes. Access to the lake is limited to members of the Diamond Lake Property Owners Association.

Glastonbury has one of the largest state forests, Meshomasic State Forest, a popular area for hiking, fishing, and hunting.

Glastonbury borders the town and cities of East Hartford, Wethersfield, Rocky Hill, Cromwell, Portland, East Hampton, Marlborough, Hebron, Bolton, and Manchester.

Climate

The town center experiences a humid continental climate (Dfa). However, the rural parts of the town, at an elevation of 800 feet near Bolton and Hebron, experience a colder climate which straddles the (Dfa) and (Dfb) lines.

Communities
Addison
Buckingham
East Glastonbury
Glastonbury Center
Hopewell
South Glastonbury

Demographics

As of the census of 2020, the racial makeup of the town was 82.8% White, 1.7% African American, 0.2% Native American, 9.1% Asian, 0.3% Pacific Islander, and 4.1% from two or more races. Hispanic or Latino of any race were 7.6% of the population. There were 35,159 people and 14,078 households. The population density was 685.9 inhabitants per square mile.

In the town, the population was spread out, with 4.8% under the age of 5, 20.8% under 18, and 20.0% 65 years of age or older. Women were 51% of the population. 

The median income for a household in the town was $130,294. The per capita income for the town was $64,200. Approximately 3.7% of the population were below the poverty line.

Economy

Top employers

Top employers in Glastonbury according to the town's 2019 Comprehensive Annual Financial Report

Arts and culture

Historical houses 
Glastonbury has the second-highest number of genuine colonial houses of any U.S. town. There are 154 houses built before 1800; only Marblehead, Massachusetts, has more, with over 200. Newport, Rhode Island, has over 300, but it is a city, not a town. Four houses in Glastonbury are from the 1600s.

The town's oldest house, the John Hollister House, was built around 1675. It is one of Connecticut's five oldest houses, and one of the oldest in the nation.

Town events and activities
The most notable town event is the CT River Valley Chamber of Commerce (formerly the Glastonbury Chamber of Commerce) Apple Harvest & Music Festival, or "Apple Fest". The festival occurs every October during the apple harvest season. It is a town-wide event lasting three days that includes live music, a 5K road race, various rides, attractions, and vendors specializing in handmade crafts.

Other events include the Under a Strawberry Moon Festival in June and various events held by the local Town Center Initiative. The Glastonbury Youth and Family Services' Creative Experiences puts on annual drama productions and family events.

Popular sporting events include three 5K races organized by the Glastonbury River Runners, a local running club. Founded in 2008 by Rich Baber, the club now has 230+ members.

The annual Glastonbury Art Walk, a joint project of the Town Center Initiative and Glastonbury Art Guild, showcases local artists' work in businesses all over the town center.

In 1993, to celebrate the 300th anniversary of the town's founding, an exchange of bands was made between Glastonbury, England, and Glastonbury, Connecticut, resulting in Glastonbury's hosting the Glastonbury Brass Band for several performances.

Glastonbury is home to several plazas that include shops and restaurants, including Eric Town Square, The Griswold Shopping Center, and Somerset Square.

Residents are also known to enjoy the orchards of South Glastonbury, most of which are along the Matson Hill road and Woodland Street area of town. There, guests can buy and pick their own freshly and locally grown produce and fruits, such as blueberries and pumpkins. In the winter, some locations sell Christmas trees.

Parks and recreation
The town has four private pool and tennis clubs: Minnechaug, Orchard Hill, Woodledge, and Pinebrook. Glastonbury also has a private country club with a golf course, Glastonbury Hills Country Club. The town's other golf course is the nine-hole Minnechaug Golf Course, at the base of Minnechaug Mountain and owned by the town.

Public aquatic facilities include the Grange pool, Eastbury Pond, an indoor pool at Glastonbury High School, and a pool at Addison Park.

Cotton Hollow Nature Preserve is in South Glastonbury and is open to residents for fishing and hiking. It is spread out across 80 acres and during the 18th and 19th centuries was home to several mills, which no longer stand, except for the ruins of the cotton mill built in 1814. The stream of water that runs through the preserve is known as Roaring Brook.

Glastonbury is also home to several parks open to residents, including Addison Park, Blackledge Falls, Buckingham Park, Butler Field, Center Green, Earle Park, Cotton Hollow Preserve, Eastbury Pond, Ferry Landing, Grange Pool, Great Pond Reserve, Hubbard Green, Riverfront Park, Salmon Brook Park, Shoddy Mill Preserve, and J.B. Williams Park.

Government

Education
Glastonbury has five elementary schools: Buttonball Lane School, Hebron Avenue School, Hopewell School, Naubuc School, and Nayaug School. A sixth, Eastbury School, closed in 2018. Each school has between 288 and 608 students. There are two middle schools. Gideon Welles School has just over 500 students in 6th grade, and Smith Middle School has 1,035 students in 7th and 8th grades. The town's high school, Glastonbury High School, has 2,173 students as of October 2013.

Glastonbury's school system was referenced in episode 563, Act 2, of NPR's " This American Life", "My Secret Public Plan".

Infrastructure

Transportation

 Glastonbury's major highway is Connecticut Route 2, serving the town with six exits.
 Connecticut Route 3 only has the Main Street exit in Glastonbury. The expressway then proceeds westward across the Putnam Bridge into Wethersfield before connecting with Interstate 91.
 Route 17 has two exits in Glastonbury: the New London Turnpike and Hubbard Street. It then reduces to a surface street, merging with Main Street in South Glastonbury.
 The 95 (formerly O) route of Connecticut Transit (CT Transit) buses runs between downtown Hartford and Glastonbury, usually terminating at the corner of Main Street and Hebron Avenue. The 91 (formerly X) route travels between Wethersfield and the Buckland Hills area in Manchester via the Somerset Square Shopping Center. The 904-Glastonbury Express route conveniently operates into Putnam Bridge, St. Paul's, and St. Augustine's Park & Ride lots.
 The Rocky Hill–Glastonbury ferry operates between May 1 and October 31. It is the nation's oldest continually operating ferry, dating to 1655. Fees are $5 for a vehicle and $1 for pedestrians and bicyclists. The trip across the Connecticut River takes about four minutes.

Notable people
 Amy Brenneman, actress
 Bob Backlund, professional wrestler
 Samuel J. Battle, first black police officer in the NYPD, lived and worked in East Glastonbury in 1899 upon coming north from North Carolina
 Candace Bushnell, author, journalist and television producer
 Laura Ingraham, conservative television host
 Helen Maria Roser, nurse, nursing educator
 Smiths of Glastonbury, family of five sisters active in 19th century women's suffrage and abolition movements
 Ocean Vuong, poet, essayist, and novelist.
 Gideon Welles, Secretary of the Navy under Abraham Lincoln
 Thomas Welles, governor of Connecticut in 1658 and 1659

References

External links

Town of Glastonbury official website
Glastonbury Chamber of Commerce

 
1693 establishments in Connecticut
Towns in Hartford County, Connecticut
Connecticut populated places on the Connecticut River
Towns in Connecticut
Greater Hartford